The 1982–83 2. Bundesliga season was the ninth season of the 2. Bundesliga, the second tier of the German football league system.

SV Waldhof Mannheim, Bayer Uerdingen and Kickers Offenbach were promoted to the Bundesliga while FC Augsburg, SpVgg Fürth, FSV Frankfurt and TuS Schloß Neuhaus were relegated to the Oberliga.

League table
For the 1982–83 season FSV Frankfurt, FC Augsburg, BV Lüttringhausen and TuS Schloß Neuhaus were newly promoted to the 2. Bundesliga from the Oberliga while SV Darmstadt 98 and MSV Duisburg had been relegated to the league from the Bundesliga.

Results

Season statistics

Top scorers
The league's top scorers:

References

External links
 2. Bundesliga 1982/1983 at Weltfussball.de 
 1982–83 2. Bundesliga at kicker.de 

1982-83
2
Ger